The World Tennis League is a non-ATP/WTA-affiliated exhibition mixed-gender team tennis tournament which is held annually at the Coca-Cola Arena in Dubai, United Arab Emirates. The first edition was held in December 2022.

Format
The players are divided into four teams, each with four or five players (two or three men and two or three women). The four teams have been named Falcons, Eagles, Kites and Hawks. The teams play each other in a round-robin format that consist of one men’s singles match, one women’s singles match and a mixed doubles match. Following the round-robin phase, the top two teams face off in the final.

Finals

References

External links
Official website

Tennis tournaments in the United Arab Emirates
Exhibition tennis tournaments
Hard court tennis tournaments
Mixed doubles tennis
Recurring sporting events established in 2022
Sports competitions in Dubai